Jimmie David Post (October 28, 1939 – September 14, 2022) was an American folk singer-songwriter, composer, playwright and actor. In 1968 his pop song "Reach out of the Darkness" charted on the Billboard Hot 100 for 14 weeks, peaking at number 10.

Life and career
Jim Post was born in Houston, Texas. He performed and recorded in the 1960s  as the duo Friend and Lover with his wife at that time, Cathy Conn Post. He worked as a solo singer-songwriter in Chicago and throughout the Midwest in the 1970s and 1980s.  Post was a regular performer at the Earl of Old Town and other Chicago folk music bars, and was a contemporary of notable singer-songwriters Steve Goodman, John Prine, Fred Holstein, and Bonnie Koloc, and a frequent collaborator with singer-songwriter and multi-instrumentalist Mick Scott and Tom Dundee.  In 1971, he produced and played on an album of Chicago folk musicians, Gathering at the Earl of Old Town, that included the first recording of Goodman's "City of New Orleans". Starting in 1985, he hosted the Flea Market folk show played on WBEZ live at Navy Pier. During the 1990s and 2000s, he focused on performing the character of Mark Twain in one-man shows in a style similar to that of Hal Holbrook's Mark Twain Tonight and Mike Randall's Mark Twain Live.  Post has also recorded an album of children's songs.

Post lived in Galena, Illinois. He was a guest on Ellen in a segment titled "Awesome Album Covers", where the talk-show host teased him about his album I Love My Life.

Post died from congestive heart failure on September 14, 2022, at the age of 82.

Discography

References

External links
 Official website
 Discography at FolkLib Index
 
 

1939 births
2022 deaths
People from Houston
Old Town School of Folk musicians
20th-century American dramatists and playwrights
Singer-songwriters from Texas
Singer-songwriters from Illinois
Guitarists from Illinois
American male guitarists
20th-century American guitarists
20th-century American male musicians
Flying Fish Records artists
Fantasy Records artists
American male singer-songwriters
Deaths from congestive heart failure